Wolfgang Leitner (born 1953) is an Austrian billionaire, and the CEO of Andritz AG, an Austrian plant engineering company.

Leitner has a doctorate in Chemistry from the University of Graz, Austria.

Leitner is married, with two children, and lives in Graz, Austria.

References

1953 births
Living people
Austrian billionaires
Businesspeople from Graz